North Carolina's 119th House district is one of 120 districts in the North Carolina House of Representatives. It has been represented by Republican Mike Clampitt since 2021.

Geography
Since 2023, the district has included all of Swain, Jackson counties, and Transylvania counties. The district overlaps with the 50th Senate district.

District officeholders since 2003

Election results

2022

2020

2018

2016

2014

2012

2010

2008

2006

2004

2002

References

North Carolina House districts
Swain County, North Carolina
Jackson County, North Carolina
Transylvania County, North Carolina